Alan Michael Reuber (born January 26, 1981) is a former American football offensive lineman for the National Football League. He played college football at Texas A&M. He was signed by the Minnesota Vikings as an undrafted free agent in 2004, but was released.
He was then signed by the Arizona Cardinals and spent the season as a backup left tackle on the 53-man roster. 
Reuber was released the next season by Arizona, but would spend parts of the next two seasons on the Cardinals practice squad.
Reuber has also been a member of the Cincinnati Bengals and Tampa Bay Buccaneers.
He was also in camp with the San Francisco 49ers in 2008.

Early years
Reuber attended Plano Senior High School in Plano, Texas and was a student and a letterman in football. In football, as a senior, he  led his team to an Area Championship, and was an All-District selection, was an All-Metroplex selection, and was named as a first-team All-State Class 5A selection.
Alan first played football in 1992 for the Azalea Bulldogs of the then Pinellas Youth Football Conference in St. Petersburg, FL.

External links
Texas A&M Aggies bio

1981 births
Living people
Players of American football from Cleveland
American football offensive guards
American football offensive tackles
Texas A&M Aggies football players
Minnesota Vikings players
Arizona Cardinals players
Cincinnati Bengals players
Cologne Centurions (NFL Europe) players
Tampa Bay Buccaneers players
San Francisco 49ers players